Trzcinica may refer to the following places:
Trzcinica, Grodzisk Wielkopolski County in Greater Poland Voivodeship (west-central Poland)
Trzcinica, Kępno County in Greater Poland Voivodeship (west-central Poland)
Trzcinica, Subcarpathian Voivodeship (south-east Poland)